Rich Reice is a retired American professional soccer forward who played in the North American Soccer League, Major Indoor Soccer League, American Soccer League and United Soccer League.

Reice attended Penn State University where he was a 1977 First Team All American soccer player. In 1978, the Philadelphia Fury selected Reice in the first round of the North American Soccer League draft. In 1980, he played for the Pennsylvania Stoners of the American Soccer League. The Stoners went to the ASL championship where they defeated the Sacramento Spirits 2-1 on goals by Reice and George Gorleku. In 1983, he joined the Wichita Wings of Major Indoor Soccer League. He also played for the Charlotte Gold.

Reice then coached the Neshaminy High School boys' team, winning the 1995 Trenton, New Jersey high school coach of the year honors.

References

External links
NASL/MISL stats

1956 births
Living people
American soccer players
American Soccer League (1933–1983) players
Carolina Lightnin' players
Charlotte Gold players
Major Indoor Soccer League (1978–1992) players
New York Nationals (USL) players
North American Soccer League (1968–1984) players
Penn State Nittany Lions men's soccer players
Pennsylvania Stoners players
Sportspeople from Bucks County, Pennsylvania
Philadelphia Fury (1978–1980) players
Soccer players from Pennsylvania
United Soccer League (1984–85) players
Wichita Wings (MISL) players
All-American men's college soccer players
People from Levittown, Pennsylvania
Association football forwards
High school soccer coaches in the United States